The 2007 AIBA World Boxing Championships were held in Chicago, United States from October 23, 2007 to November 3, 2007.  It was held at the UIC Pavilion. It was the biggest World Championships in AIBA history.

The competition is under the supervision of the world's governing body for amateur boxing  AIBA.

Medal winners

Medal table

See also
 AIBA World Boxing Championships

References

External links
 
 Results

World Amateur Boxing Championships
Boxing Championships
AIBA World Boxing Championships
Boxing in Chicago
World Boxing Championships 2007
World Boxing Championships 2007
2000s in Chicago
2007 in Illinois
AIBA World Boxing Championships
AIBA World Boxing Championships